HMS Bloxham was a Hunt-class minesweeper of the Royal Navy from World War I. She was originally to be named Brixham, but this was changed to avoid any conflict between the vessel name and a coastal location.

See also
 Bloxham, Oxfordshire

References
 

 

Hunt-class minesweepers (1916)
Royal Navy ship names
1919 ships